The Stanley M. Isaacs Houses (or Isaacs Houses) is a public housing project for those of low-to-moderate incomes located just south of 96th street in the Manhattan neighborhood of Yorkville. The Isaacs Houses and the Holmes Towers borders East Harlem, which has the second highest concentration of public housing in the New York City. The three public housing buildings in the Yorkville neighborhood of Manhattan in New York City, are 24 stories tall and contain 635 apartments. The project is located between 93rd and 95th Streets with playground & ball courts from 95th-97th street, stretching from 1st Avenue to the FDR Drive.

Development 
The Isaacs Houses were designed by architects Frederick G. Frost, Jr. & Associates and completed in 1965. They were originally called the Gerard Swope Houses but renamed in 1963 the Isaacs Houses after Stanley M. Isaacs, who served as Manhattan Borough President under Mayor LaGuardia and later in City Council for 20 years as minority leader. 45 percent of the apartments in Isaacs are set aside for tenants over the age of 62.

The development has been designated a "high crime zone" by the New York City Police Department's 19th precinct since the early 2000s, and are thus policed to a higher extent, especially due to the heavy socio-economic mixing of the immediate surrounding area, which includes public housing, working-class small tenement buildings, middle-class medium-size buildings, and upper-middle class to upper-class luxury buildings along 1st avenue in the area.

The housing project started as a unique and unprecedented community experiment by selecting many of the initial residents from the local Catholic parish, with assistance of Leyda Jimenez and other community ambassadors involved with the local Catholic Church. While this created a tight-knit, low-crime community for the first few decades of the Isaac Houses’ history, today the houses are known for higher crime rates. In 2018, the Isaacs Houses along with the Holmes Towers and Robbins Plaza, which are all run by the same managers, ranked the worst in the nation after federal inspections by the United States Department of Housing and Urban Development.

See also
New York City Housing Authority
List of New York City Housing Authority properties
 Stanley M. Isaacs Neighborhood Center

References

Public housing in Manhattan
Residential buildings in Manhattan
Residential buildings completed in 1965
Yorkville, Manhattan
1965 establishments in New York City